Ray Moyer  (February 21, 1898 – February 6, 1986) was an American set decorator. He won three Academy Awards and was nominated for nine more in the category Best Art Direction. He was born in Santa Barbara, California and died in Los Angeles, California.

Selected filmography

Moyer won three Academy Awards for Best Art Direction and was nominated for nine more:

Won
 Samson and Delilah (1949)
 Sunset Boulevard (1950)
 Cleopatra (1963)

Nominated
 Lady in the Dark (1944)
 Love Letters (1945)
 Kitty (1945)
 Red Garters (1954)
 Sabrina (1954)
 The Ten Commandments (1956)
 Funny Face (1957)
 Breakfast at Tiffany's (1961)
 The Greatest Story Ever Told (1965)

References

External links

1898 births
1986 deaths
American set decorators
Best Art Direction Academy Award winners
People from Santa Barbara, California